The  refers to a series of game fixing scandals in Japan's Nippon Professional Baseball (NPB) league between 1969 and 1971. The fallout from these scandals resulted in several star players receiving long suspensions, salary cuts, or being banned from professional play entirely. The scandals led many fans in Japan to abandon the sport, and also to the sale of such illustrious teams as the Nishitetsu Lions and Toei Flyers (now the Seibu Lions and Hokkaidō Nippon Ham Fighters).

The term "black mist" was a reference to a political scandal that had enveloped the administration of Prime Minister Eisaku Satō just a few years earlier; "bribery was said to envelop politics like a black mist."

History 
The Black Mist Scandal had multiple components, involving the yakuza and members of both Nippon Professional Baseball (NPB) and professional auto racing teams. Baseball players and executives were implicated in fixing competitions in both sports. The bulk of the revelations around the scandal came out between the fall of 1969 and the spring of 1970. Eventually, more than fifteen NPB players and coaches were implicated in game-fixing and sports betting, while five auto racers were found to be involved in a race-fixing scheme. Members of nine NPB teams were implicated, with seven players coming from the Nishitetsu Lions alone. Ten NPB current and former players — including star pitchers Masaaki Ikenaga, Kentarō Ogawa, and Tsutomu Tanaka — were banned from the game for life.

Game-fixing 
On October 7, 1969, the Lions' front office discovered pitcher Masayuki Nagayasu taking bribes from a yakuza clan to throw games. The team announced that Nagayasu would be released after the end of the season, and the story was reported in Japanese newspapers the next day. Late in November, the executive committee presiding over the NPB at the time voted to ban Nagayasu from the league for life, the first time any player had been banned from Japanese baseball.

On April 1, 1970, in an exclusive tape-recorded interview with the Shūkan Post newspaper, also broadcast on Fuji Television, Nagayasu revealed that other players on his former team were also involved in game-fixing. The NPB summoned seven players to testify about their involvement: Nagayasu, team ace Masaaki Ikenaga, pitchers Yoshinobu Yoda and Akio Masuda, catcher Kimiyasu Murakami, and infielders Kazuhide Funada and Mitsuo Motoi. Yoda and Masuda admitted their involvement. Ikenaga claimed to be uninvolved, but had not returned the ¥1 million he had received from Chunichi Dragons pitcher and former teammate Tsutomu Tanaka as an invitation to cheat.

One month later, Toei Flyers pitchers Toshiaki Moriyasu and Mitsugu Tanaka were revealed to be under suspicion of throwing baseball games. A subsequent report revealed that Kintetsu Buffaloes front-office official Akira Yano had been coerced into throwing games as a player during the 1967 season.

On May 25, 1970, the executive committee issued the following punishments to the accused Nishitetsu players:
 Masayuki Ikenaga, Yoshinobu Yoda, Akio Masuda: Banned for life
 Kimiyasu Murakami and Kazuhide Funada: Suspended until the end of the 1970 season
 Mitsuo Motoi: Given a "severe warning"

In June the committee banned the Buffaloes' Akira Yano from baseball for life. In July, Buffaloes outfielder Masahiro Doi was prosecuted for illegal gambling. He was later suspended by the NPB for a month.

On July 30, 1970, the committee issued the following punishments for the Toei players:
 Toshiaki Moriyasu: Banned from baseball for life
 Mitsugu Tanaka: Received a warning

On November 30, Hanshin Tigers pitcher Yutaka Enatsu received a stern warning from the Central League president due to "involvement with persons in baseball gambling."

On January 11, 1971, Nankai Hawks pitcher Kiyohiro Miura received a stern warning for receiving an invitation to throw games from teammate Kimihiro Satō and not reporting it. On January 29 of that year, Taiyō coach Takashi Suzuki and pitcher Shōji Sakai were barred from playing in the NPB for their involvement with the yakuza. Finally, on February 15, 1971, Lotte Orions pitcher Fumio Narita was suspended for a month for his involvement with bookmakers.

Race-fixing 
On April 22, 1970, an auto racer under investigation for rule violations in a race revealed that baseball players were involved in a scheme to fix the results of races. Three men were arrested under suspicion of participating in the scheme: Chunichi Dragons pitcher Tsutomu Tanaka, Taiyō Whales pitcher Isao Takayama, and yakuza member Hirotaka Fujinawa. A few weeks later, Kentarō Ogawa, star pitcher for the Dragons, was arrested for taking part in the auto-race fixing. Later on in May, Hanshin Tigers infielder Takao Katsuragi was arrested in the auto-race scandal. In June, the NPB committee banned Ogawa from baseball for life; they suspended Katsuragi for three months.

On September 8, 1970, Yakult Swallows infielder Takeshi Kuwata (who had been the 1959 rookie of the year) was arrested for his role in the auto-racing scandal. He would later receive a three-month suspension from the NPB, but his involvement effectively barred him from signing with another team, and he retired at the end of the year.

Ikenaga's reinstatement
Ikenaga's banning was fiercely contested by both Nishitetsu's front office and Ikenaga's family. His case was not taken up by the NPB until March 2005, when commissioner Yasuchika Negoro and team owners agreed on a bylaw that allowed banned players who have reformed themselves to petition for a removal of the ban. Ikenaga requested a removal soon afterwards, and on April 25, 2005, he was allowed to return to baseball.

Timeline

1969 
 October 7, 1969: Nishitetsu front office discovers Masayuki Nagayasu taking bribes from an organized crime family to throw games. The team announces that Nagayasu will be released after the end of the regular season, just days away. 
 October 8: The story is reported in Japanese newspapers.
 November 28: Nagayasu banned from the league for life.

1970 
 April 1, 1970: Nagayasu reveals that other players on his former team were also involved in game-fixing. Seven players testify on their involvement: Nagayasu, Masaaki Ikenaga, Yoshinobu Yoda, Akio Masuda, Kimiyasu Murakami, Kazuhide Funada, and Mitsuo Motoi.
 April 22: Auto racer under investigation for rule violations reveals that baseball players are involved in a scheme to fix the results of races. Tsutomu Tanaka (Chunichi Dragons), Isao Takayama (Taiyō Whales), and yakuza member Hirotaka Fujinawa are arrested.
 May 6: Kentarō Ogawa (Chunichi Dragons) arrested for taking part in the auto-race fixing.
 May 9: Toei Flyers pitchers Toshiaki Moriyasu and Mitsugu Tanaka are revealed to be under suspicion of throwing baseball games.
 May 14: Report reveals that Kintetsu Buffaloes front-office official Akira Yano was coerced into throwing games as a player in the 1967 season.
 May 19: Takao Katsuragi (Hanshin Tigers) arrested in the auto-race scandal.
 May 25: Commissioner committee issues the following punishments to Nishitetsu players:
 Masaaki Ikenaga, Yoshinobu Yoda, Akio Masuda: Banned for life
 Kimiyasu Murakami and Kazuhide Funada: Suspended until the end of the 1970 season
 Mitsuo Motoi: Severe warning
 June 3: Kentarō Ogawa (Dragons) banned from baseball for life.
 June 15: Akira Yano (Buffaloes front-office) banned from baseball for life.
 June 18: Takao Katsuragi (Tigers) suspended by the commissioner committee for three months.
 July 1: Masahiro Doi (Kintetsu Buffaloes) prosecuted for illegal gambling. Later suspended by the league for a month.
 July 30: Toshiaki Moriyasu (Toei) banned from baseball for life. Mitsugu Tanaka (Toei) receives a warning.
 September 8: Takeshi Kuwata (Yakult Swallows) arrested in the auto-racing scandal. Later receives three-month suspension.
 November 30: Yutaka Enatsu (Hanshin Tigers) receives a stern warning from the Central League president due to "involvement with persons in baseball gambling."

1971 
 January 11, 1971: Kiyohiro Miura (Nankai Hawks) receives stern warning for receiving an invitation to throw games from teammate Kimihiro Satō and not reporting it.
 January 29: Taiyō coach Takashi Suzuki and pitcher Shōji Sakai barred from playing in the premiere league for their involvement with the Yakuza.
 February 15: Fumio Narita (Lotte Orions) suspended for a month due to his involvement with bookmakers.

Players implicated

Warned 
 Yutaka Enatsu (P), Hanshin Tigers — accused of "involvement with persons in baseball gambling;" received a stern warning from the Central League president
 Kiyohiro Miura (P), Nankai Hawks
 Mitsuo Motoi (IF), Nishitetsu Lions — given a "severe warning"
 Mitsugu Tanaka (P), Toei Flyers

Suspended 
 Masahiro Doi (OF), Kintetsu Buffaloes — prosecuted for illegal gambling; suspended for a month
 Kazuhide Funada (IF), Nishitetsu Lions — suspended until end of 1970 season
 Takao Katsuragi (IF), Hanshin Tigers — arrested in the auto-race scandal; suspended for three months
 Kimiyasu Murakami (C), Nishitetsu Lions — suspended until end of 1970 season
 Fumio Narita (P), Lotte Orions — involved with bookmakers; suspended for a month

Retired 
 Takeshi Kuwata (IF), Yakult Swallows — arrested in the auto-racing scandal; suspended for three months, subsequently blacklisted; eventually retired
  Kimihiro Satō (P), Nankai Hawks — accused of inviting teammate Kiyohiro Miura to throw games; had already left professional baseball after 1969 season
 Isao Takayama (P), Taiyō Whales — accused of auto race-fixing; had already left professional baseball after 1966 season

Banned for life 
 Masaaki Ikenaga (P), Nishitetsu Lions (reinstated in 2005)
 Akio Masuda (P), Nishitetsu Lions
 Toshiaki Moriyasu (P), Toei Flyers
 Masayuki Nagayasu (P), Nishitetsu Lions — accused of taking bribes from an organized crime family to throw games. Released after the end of the 1969 season; later banned for life
 Kentarō Ogawa (P), Chunichi Dragons — arrested; accused of auto race-fixing
 Shōji Sakai (P), Taiyō Whales— barred from playing in NPB for involvement with the Yakuza
 Takashi Suzuki (P/coach), Taiyō Whales — barred from playing in NPB for involvement with the Yakuza
 Tsutomu Tanaka (P), Chunichi Dragons — arrested; accused of auto race-fixing
 Akira Yano (P), Kintetsu Buffaloes — former player now an executive coerced into throwing games in the 1967 season
 Yoshinobu Yoda (P), Nishitetsu Lions — accused of game-fixing

References

Baseball in Japan
History of baseball in Japan
1969 in baseball
1970 in baseball
1971 in baseball
Baseball controversies
Sports scandals in Japan
Sports betting scandals